Boi (plural: bois) is slang within gay male and butch and femme communities for several sexual or gender identities. In some lesbian communities, there is an increasing acceptance of variant gender expression, as well as allowing people to identify as a boi. 

The term has also been used, independently of any meaning related to sexuality, as an alternate spelling for boy.

Usage

In the LGBT community
The term boi may be used to denote a number of other sexual orientations and possibilities that are not mutually exclusive:

A boyish lesbian.
A submissive butch in the BDSM community.
A young trans man, or a trans man who is in the earlier stages of transitioning.
A younger bisexual or gay man who may have effeminate characteristics. The term can also be used by anyone who wishes to distinguish from heterosexual or heteronormative identities.

Boi may also refer to someone assigned female at birth, who generally does not identify as, or only partially identifies as feminine, female, a girl, or a woman. Some bois are trans or intersex people.
They may be gay or queer. Many trans bois are also genderqueer/nonbinary (in itself a trans/transgender group), or might identify as cis persons or trans men, and yet practice genderfuck in which they do not fit in either masculine or feminine binary gender presentation. Bois may prefer a range of pronouns, including "he", "she", or nonbinary and gender-neutral pronouns such as "they".

Usage in Suffolk dialect 

in the Suffolk dialect, the term boi is often used as a familiar term (similar to British mate) for male (and more rarely female) friends. It can be used for anyone, with a Suffolk son just as likely to call their father boi as a Suffolk father calling their son. In practice, the pronunciation is not an enunciated "boi" but more like "buh" or "bor."

Usage in popular culture and meme culture 
One of the earliest usages of the term boi was with the rapper Big Boi. In the early 2000s the term came into usage within skateboarding culture. The term came into popular culture again with the song "Sk8er Boi" by Avril Lavigne. The term came into meme culture with the Dat Boi meme: an animation of a frog on a unicycle usually accompanied by the caption "Here come dat boi. (O shit waddup!)"

See also 
 Dat Boi

References

External links

 

Androgyny
Butch and femme
Gender roles in the LGBT community
LGBT slang
Trans men's culture